This was the first edition of the tournament.

Mackenzie McDonald and Tommy Paul won the title after defeating Maverick Banes and Jason Kubler 7–6(7–4), 6–4 in the final.

Seeds

Draw

References
 Main Draw

City of Playford Tennis International - Men's Doubles